is a former Japanese football player and manager.

Playing career
Kimura was born in Yamato on January 24, 1972. After graduating from Komazawa University, he joined the Japan Football League (JFL) club Kyoto Purple Sanga in 1994. In 1996, he played for the Regional Leagues club Blaze Kumamoto, JFL club Denso, and Ventforet Kofu. At Ventforet Kofu, the club was promoted to the new J2 League. He played as a regular right side back. In 2000, he moved to the J1 League club JEF United Ichihara. However he did not play in any matches. In 2001, he moved to the Prefectural Leagues club Gunma FC Horikoshi. In 2003, he moved to New Zealand and played for East Auckland, University-Mount Wellington, and Onehunga Sports. He retired at the end of the 2004 season.

Coaching career
In 2012, Kimura became a manager for the Regional Leagues club SC Sagamihara in 2012. The club was promoted to the Japan Football League in 2013 and the J3 League in 2014. In 2015, he moved to the Regional Leagues club Vonds Ichihara and became a coach. In May 2014, he became a manager and managed the club until the end of the 2014 season.

Club statistics

Managerial statistics

References

External links
 
 

1972 births
Living people
People from Yamato, Kanagawa
Komazawa University alumni
Association football people from Kanagawa Prefecture
Japanese footballers
J1 League players
J2 League players
Japan Football League (1992–1998) players
Kyoto Sanga FC players
FC Kariya players
Ventforet Kofu players
JEF United Chiba players
Arte Takasaki players
Japanese expatriate footballers
Japanese football managers
J3 League managers
SC Sagamihara managers
Association football defenders